Bishop Butler may refer to:
Joseph Butler (b. 1692), Anglican Bishop of Bristol and Durham
John Butler, 12th Baron Dunboyne (1731–1800), Roman Catholic Bishop of Cork
Christopher Butler (b. 1902), Catholic Bishop of Nova Barbara and Auxiliary Bishop of the Archdiocese of Westminster
Thomas Frederick Butler (b. 1940), Anglican Bishop of Southwark